"The Elevator" is the first segment of the sixteenth episode from the first season (1985–86) of the television series The Twilight Zone. In this segment, two brothers search for their mad scientist father in his hidden lair. The title has a double-meaning, referring both to the literal elevator that the two brothers used to ride and that reveals the twist, while also to the scientist's status as an "elevator", elevating the size and status of animals, and disrupting nature in the process (e.g. moving a spider to the top of the food chain).

The segment was written by Ray Bradbury, making it one of just two segments of the series (the other one being "Button, Button") to be written by a writer for the original The Twilight Zone. Bradbury wrote the original series episode "I Sing the Body Electric".

Plot
Late at night, brothers Will and Roger arrive at a closed factory in search of their missing father, who is undertaking secret experiments to solve world hunger. Though Roger is skeptical of his father, Will defends his experiments.

Upon entering the building, they use flashlights to follow a set of footprints in the dust to a room that Will was warned never to enter. Going inside, they find a trail of gigantic dead rats. These are followed by the bodies of a domestic cat and a dog, both also of enormous size. Roger believes that whatever food their father created must have increased the size of the animals. Will sees a mass of strands in one corner that apparently are pure protein.

Concluding that something even larger killed the cat and the dog, Will and Roger follow the footsteps to an old elevator. Roger thinks that the elevator is broken, but Will pushes the button again and they hear it moving. When it reaches the ground, they realize it is not the elevator but a huge spider, explaining the dead animals and the white strands, which is actually webbing. The spider snatches the brothers and drags them upward into the darkness. Moments later, their flashlight crashes to the floor, along with several drops of blood.

External links
 
 Postcards From The Zone – episode 1.39 The Elevator

The Twilight Zone (1985 TV series season 1) episodes
1986 American television episodes
Fiction about size change
Works set in elevators

fr:L'Ascenseur (La Cinquième Dimension)